NBA 08 is an NBA basketball video game developed by San Diego Studio and published by Sony Computer Entertainment. It was released on September 26, 2007 for PlayStation 3 and October 12, 2007 for PlayStation Portable and PlayStation 2.

Gameplay
In the main mode, a coach has had a rise in fame, but after last year's championship win, he announces he is retiring. It's up to the player to make his last year worthwhile.

Reception

The PSP version received "generally favorable reviews", while the PS2 and PS3 versions received "mixed" reviews, according to Metacritic.

References

External links

2007 video games
National Basketball Association video games
PlayStation Portable games
PlayStation 3 games
PlayStation 2 games
Sony Interactive Entertainment games
North America-exclusive video games
Video games developed in the United States
San Diego Studio games